The Gunsight Limestone Member is a geologic member in Texas. It preserves fossils.

Named in 1919 as the top member of Gunsight formation in Texas, by Frederick B. Plummer. Raymond C. Moore and Plummer assigned the Gunsight limestone to the Graham Formation.

See also

 List of fossiliferous stratigraphic units in Texas
 Paleontology in Texas

References

Geologic formations of Texas